This is a list of states in the Holy Roman Empire beginning with the letter Z:

References
 Holy Roman Empire History

Z